The Moapa Band of Paiute Indians of the Moapa River Indian Reservation are a federally recognized tribe of Southern Paiute, who live in southern Nevada on the Moapa River Indian Reservation.  They were in the past called the Muappa / Moapat and the Nuwuvi.

Art and material culture
The Moapa are adept at basketry.  They traditionally wore clothing made of hide, yucca fibers, and cliff-rose bark cloth.

History

The Moapa practiced irrigation agriculture before contact with Europeans. The Moapa traded with the Spanish in the later 18th and early 19th centuries who arrived here from California and Arizona, yet no missions were built in the area.

In 1869 the United States relocated by force the Southern Paiute to the Moapa area.

They later suffered from decimation by disease in the 1920s and 1930s.

In 1941, they organized with a formal constitution. In 1980 the Moapa River reservation was expanded, with about  added. People on the reservation continue to suffer high rates of unemployment, and diabetes, resulting in some of the Moapa migrating to other parts of the country to find work.

Reservation

The Moapa River Indian Reservation is located near Moapa Town, Nevada. Moapa River Indian Reservation consists of 71,954 acres (29,119 hectares). As of the census of 2010, the population was 238, up from 206 in 2000.

The reservation is crossed from northeast to southwest by the I-15 highway. In the southeast, it is adjacent to Valley of Fire State Park. In particular, Exit 75 of the highway and the local road leading to the west park entrance (formerly Nevada 169, decommissioned in 2001), down to the entrance, belong to the reservation.

Energy 
The reservation includes a 250 MW solar power generation facility known as Moapa Southern Paiute Solar Project which generates enough energy to power 111,000 homes, displacing around 341,000 metric tons of carbon dioxide annually. Another solar farm Eagle Shadow Mountain Solar Farm is being constructed in the reservation is a planned 300 MW solar project.

In 2019, Paiutes agreed with Berkshire Hathaway's NV Energy about two solar and battery projects:

8minutenergy Renewables develops the 300 MW(ac) Southern Bighorn Solar & Storage Center with 540 MWh (4 hours of 135 MW) storage.

EDF Renouvelables constructs the 200 MW(ac) Arrow Canyon Solar Project with 375 MWh (5 hours of 75 MW) storage, operational by 2023.

References

Native American tribes in Nevada
Southern Paiute
Federally recognized tribes in the United States